Urakovo (Uraq) is a rural locality (a village) in Atarshinsky Selsoviet, Belokataysky District, Bashkortostan, Russia. The population was 173 as of 2010. There are 5 streets.

Geography 
Urakovo is located 13 km southeast of Novobelokatay (the district's administrative centre) by road. Atarsha is the nearest rural locality.

References 

Rural localities in Belokataysky District